Tomasz Porębski (born 12 January 1992) is a Polish footballer playing currently for FC Blaubeuren 1995 in Germany.

Career
In July 2015, Porębski joined Olimpia Zambrów. He played 17 league games for the club, then a year later joined Mazur Ełk. He then played for Tur Bielsk Podlaski in the 2017/18 season and the 2018/19 season with his former club Olimpia Zambrów, before he in February 2019 moved to Germany and signed with FC Blaubeuren 1995.

References

External links
 
 

1992 births
Living people
Polish footballers
Sportspeople from Białystok
Jagiellonia Białystok players
Olimpia Zambrów players
Wigry Suwałki players
GKS Tychy players
Mazur Ełk players
I liga players
II liga players
Association football defenders